Indonesia 1 Tower is an under-construction twin towers consisting of north and south towers at Jalan M.H. Thamrin in Central Jakarta, Indonesia. After completion, this will be the tallest twin towers in Indonesia. It is designed by Mercurio Design Lab. 

The towers will have offices, stores, condominiums and service apartments. North Tower with height 303 meters and south tower 306 meters . Construction of the tower is expected to be finished by 2021. South Tower is an office building while North Tower  is a multi functional building that includes offices, retail space, and service apartments. Pan Pacific Serviced Suites will occupy levels 47 to 58 in the North Tower of Indonesia I.

It will be connected by tunnel to Bundaran Hotel Indonesia station of Jakarta MRT.

Officially launched via Press Conference in Jakarta, 29 August 2019 at Bromo Ballroom, Grand Hyatt Jakarta   

The construction was halted in 19 April 2020 due to COVID-19 pandemic. At the end of first quarter in 2022, Indonesian media conglomerate, Media Group acquired the two towers from China-Sonangol International.Ltd. after the cancellation of joint venture between the two. As of October 2022, the construction is ongoing for a completion date in 2024.

See also

List of tallest buildings in Indonesia
List of tallest buildings in Jakarta

References

Media Group
Towers in Indonesia
Buildings and structures in Jakarta
Skyscrapers in Indonesia
Post-independence architecture of Indonesia
Skyscraper office buildings in Indonesia